Ernst Küppers (July 9, 1904 – July 24, 1976) was a German backstroke swimmer who competed in the 1928 Summer Olympics and in the 1932 Summer Olympics. He was born in Viersen and died in Nordhorn. He was the husband of Reni Erkens and the father of Ernst-Joachim Küppers.

In 1928 he finished fifth in the 100 metre backstroke competition. Four years later he again finished fifth in the 100 metre backstroke event at the 1932 Games.

Thinking Kuppers was likely to win the 100 metre backstroke at the 1934 European Championships in Magdeburg, Hitler commissioned a large bronze eagle trophy for the race. When John Besford of England won the race, Hitler refused to present the trophy as intended and left the stadium, leaving one of his officials to present it instead to Küppers’ rival.

External links
profile

1904 births
1976 deaths
People from Viersen
Sportspeople from Düsseldorf (region)
German male swimmers
Olympic swimmers of Germany
Swimmers at the 1928 Summer Olympics
Swimmers at the 1932 Summer Olympics
European Aquatics Championships medalists in swimming
Male backstroke swimmers
20th-century German people